East Scrafton is a hamlet in the Yorkshire Dales in the Richmondshire district of North Yorkshire, England. There is also a larger West Scrafton to the south.

The name Scrafton comes from Old English and means  farmstead near a hollow.

References

External links

Villages in North Yorkshire
Coverdale (dale)